Maria Karnilova (August 3, 1920 – April 20, 2001) was an American dancer and actress. She was initially known legally as Maria Karniloff.

She was born in Hartford, Connecticut, the daughter of Filip (Philip) and Stefanida Dovgolenko (or Dowholonok), emigrants from Tsarist Russia. The family later moved to Brooklyn, New York. She started her professional career in 1927 in the Children's Ballet of the Metropolitan Opera and joined the corps when Ballet Theater, now American Ballet Theater, was founded in 1939. She adopted the name Karniloff, and later, Karnilova as her professional name. Her professional surname was often ascribed as her own mother's maiden name, however, that is inaccurate as her mother's maiden name was "Shlonskaya".

Karnilova made her Broadway debut in 1946 in Call Me Mister. She won the Tony Award for Best Featured Actress in a Musical for the original 1964 production of Fiddler on the Roof starring Zero Mostel and was nominated as Tony Award for Best Actress in a Musical for Zorba (1968).

Other Broadway credits include Miss Liberty (1949), Two's Company (1952), Jerome Robbins' Ballet: U.S.A. (1958), Gypsy (as the original "Tessie Tura"; 1959),  Bravo Giovanni (1962), Gigi (1973), God's Favorite (1974), Bring Back Birdie (1981), and the 1981 revival of Fiddler. Her film credits include The Unsinkable Molly Brown (1964) and Married to the Mob (1988).

Family
She was married to actor George S. Irving from 1948 until her death from undisclosed causes in Manhattan at the age of 80 in 2001. She was survived by her husband, two children, three grandchildren, and extended family. Her widower, George S. Irving, died in 2016, aged 94.

Filmography

References

External links
 Profile, ibdb.com; accessed April 18, 2018.
 
 

1920 births
2001 deaths
Actresses from New York City
American ballerinas
American musical theatre actresses
American film actresses
American people of Russian descent
Tony Award winners
Musicians from New York City
20th-century American singers
20th-century American women singers
20th-century American actresses
20th-century American ballet dancers